"Smuckers" (stylized in all caps) is a song by American rapper Tyler, the Creator featuring Lil Wayne and Kanye West, from Tyler's third studio album Cherry Bomb (2015). It features background vocals from Samantha Nelson. The song was originally supposed to feature Kanye West and Jay-Z.

Background
West disses shoe company Nike with the lines: "Why, why, why?/Why don't they like me?/Cause Nike gave lot of niggas checks/But I'm the only nigga ever to check Nike". He went on to diss the company further in promotional single "Facts" in late 2015.

The track was performed by Tyler on Jimmy Kimmel Live! in July 2015 alongside the album's title track. In November 2016, a video clip was shared by Eric Diep of Tyler speaking about why the song will be legendary.

Composition and writing
The song includes a sample of "Metropolis Notte" by Gabriele Ducros. Its first verse is rapped by Tyler, the second is rapped by West, whilst the third and final verse is rapped by both Tyler and Wayne. West explained that he rewrote his verse after hearing Tyler and Wayne on "Smuckers" in Tyler's 2017 documentary about Cherry Bomb.

Recording
Tyler revealed in April 2015 that the track was originally supposed to be a Kanye West and Jay-Z record. Prior to the release of the Cherry Bomb documentary, a video clip from it was shared of West recording his verse on the track in January 2017.

Commercial performance
"Smuckers" reached number 8 on the US Billboard Bubbling Under R&B/Hip-Hop Singles chart upon the album's release, making the song the only non-single release from it to chart.

Charts

References

2015 songs
Kanye West songs
Lil Wayne songs
Songs written by Kanye West
Songs written by Lil Wayne
Songs written by Tyler, the Creator
Tyler, the Creator songs